Hauptmann Martin Zander was a World War I flying ace credited with five aerial victories. He was appointed to command one of the original German fighter squadrons, Jagdstaffel 1, before becoming an instructor.

Biography
Early in World War I, Martin Zander flew in an artillery cooperation unit, Flieger-Abteilung (Artillerie) 90. He was transferred from there to take up command of a fighter detachment, Kampfeinsitzerkommando Nord. He shot down two enemy airplanes while flying with this detachment. Then, as the German military concentrated their fighters into squadrons, Zander was posted to lead Jagdstaffel 1. His tenure as commanding officer began with the new squadron's founding, on 22 August 1916. He would shoot down three British airplanes to become an ace while leading this squadron—one victory each in August, September, and October 1916. On 10 November 1916, he was transferred from combat duty to become an instructor, and saw no further battle assignments.

Martin Zander died in 1925.

End notes

References
 Above the Lines: The Aces and Fighter Units of the German Air Service, Naval Air Service and Flanders Marine Corps, 1914–1918. Norman Franks, Frank W. Bailey, Russell Guest. Grub Street, 1993. , .

See also
 Aerial victory standards of World War I

German World War I flying aces
1925 deaths
1882 births
Luftstreitkräfte officers
Recipients of the Iron Cross (1914)